The official German airplay chart ranks the most frequently broadcast songs on German radio stations. In 2019, 19 different songs reached the top, based on weekly airplay data compiled by MusicTrace on behalf of Bundesverband Musikindustrie (BVMI). The radio stations are chosen based on the reach of each station. A specific number of evaluated stations is not given.

Chart history

References

Germany airplay
Airplay 2019